Church of San Lorenzo de Carangas is a church located in the city of Potosí in the department of the same name, in Bolivia. According to historians, it was formerly called "La Anunciación" and, together with the Church of Santa Bárbara, they were the first churches built in the city. The construction of San Lorenzo "La Anunciación" began in 1548, but a heavy snowfall collapsed the church ten years later, so it had to be repaired. Upon the arrival of Viceroy Francisco de Toledo, its name was changed to San Lorenzo de Carangas, as it was destined for the cult of the Carangas indigenous people. When the current cathedral was built, it became an Indian parish.

However, the greatest remodeling corresponds to the 18th century and completed in 1744, a time when the dome was raised and the Andean Baroque portal of vast ornamental richness was made.

An embroidered effect was achieved through the use of diagonal cuts is low relief. Widely flora and fauna, including viscacha, vicuña, heads of puma, sun disks, angels faces, mermaids who strum guitars, maize, (etc.) are fantastic references to the Incan past mixed with Spanish culture, are carvings of this colonial church.

Church of San Lorenzo de Carangas is widely considered the ultimate in planiform design.

It is part of the UNESCO World Heritage Site "City of Potosí".

Gallery

References

External links

Buildings and structures in Potosí
Roman Catholic churches completed in 1744
Andean Baroque architecture
Baroque church buildings in Bolivia